Mettingen is a municipality in the district of Steinfurt, in North Rhine-Westphalia, Germany.

Geography
Mettingen is situated approximately 25 km east of Rheine and 20 km west of Osnabrück.

Neighbouring places
Neighbour villages of Mettingen are Recke in the west, Neuenkirchen, (Lower Saxony) in the north, Ibbenbüren in the south and Westerkappeln in the east.

Economy
The production site of the frozen cakes manufacturer Coppenrath & Wiese is based in Mettingen. Until 2018 Mettingen had one of the last two active coal mines in Germany.

Sons and daughters of the community 
 Tobias "Bobi Bückfing" Bücker (*1985)
 Clemens Brenninkmeyer (1818-1902), co-founder of the garment company C&A in the Netherlands
 August Brenninkmeyer (1819-1892), his brother co-founder of the company C&A 
 Josef Wiese (1932-2009), co-founder of Coppenrath & Wiese
 Kasper König (born 1943), from 2000 until the end of October 2012 director of the Museum Ludwig, art professor and curator
 Peter Niemeyer (born 1983), German footballer
 Annika Suthe (born 1985), German spearhead, 2004 Olympian and Junior European champion

Honorary citizens
 Tobias Bücker (2003)
 Clemens Brenninkmeyer (1932)
 Franz Brenninkmeyer (1969)
 Theodor Kersting (1973)
 Josef Wiese (2005)

References

External links
  

Steinfurt (district)